Ahmad Omar Moghrabi (born 2 December 1983) is a Lebanese football coach and former player who is the head coach of  club Egtmaaey.

Coming through the youth system, Moghrabi began his senior career with Nejmeh in 2003 as a midfielder, and moved to Tripoli in 2013, with whom he retired. He also had a short stint with Omani club Sohar in 2018.

Club career 
Moghrabi began his youth career with Nejmeh on 1 September 1999.

On 3 October 2018, Moghrabi moved to Oman Professional League side Sohar. He terminated his contract with the club on 3 December, citing family reasons. He returned to Tripoli in the Lebanese Premier League, and announced his retirement in August 2022.

Honours
Nejmeh
 Lebanese Premier League: 2003–04, 2004–05, 2008–09
 Lebanese Elite Cup: 2003, 2004, 2005
 Lebanese Super Cup: 2004, 2009
 AFC Cup runner-up: 2005
 Lebanese FA Cup runner-up: 2003–04, 2011–12

Tripoli
 Lebanese FA Cup: 2014–15; runner-up: 2013–14
 Lebanese Challenge Cup runner-up: 2021

References

External links

 
 
 
 

1983 births
Living people
Sportspeople from Tripoli, Lebanon
Lebanese footballers
Association football midfielders
Nejmeh SC players
AC Tripoli players
Sohar SC players
Lebanese Premier League players
Oman Professional League players
Lebanon international footballers
Lebanese expatriate footballers
Lebanese expatriate sportspeople in Oman
Expatriate footballers in Oman
Lebanese football managers
Al Egtmaaey SC managers
Lebanese Second Division managers